This is a list of episodes for the premiere season (1987) of the television series Married... with Children.

This season introduces the major characters: Al, Peg, Kelly and Bud Bundy, along with their neighbors, Steve and Marcy Rhoades. The first season is the only one in which Al and Peg are regularly intimate, to the point of Al initiating the sessions. It is also the only one where Peg can be seen doing housework under normal circumstances, and she even has her own car (as seen in "Sixteen Years and What Do You Get"). In "Thinergy," Bud mentions that Kelly had been held back a year in school. Al's dislike of the French is first shown in this season and it is also the first time that he calls Marcy a "chicken." It also contains the first mention of Peg's family being "hillbillies" from the fictional Wanker County, Wisconsin.

Original Pilot

In the show's pilot episode, Tina Caspary played the role of Kelly Bundy, while Hunter Carson played Bud.  Before the series aired publicly  and at the behest of Ed O'Neill  the roles for the two Bundy children were re-cast.  O'Neill felt a lack of chemistry with the original actors cast as the children.  He requested a re-cast, which the producers approved.  All of the scenes in the original pilot were re-shot with the replacement actors, Christina Applegate and David Faustino.

Episodes

References 

1987 American television seasons
01